Alyzeus was in Greek mythology a son of Icarius and Polycaste, and brother of Penelope and Leucadius. After his father's death, he reigned in conjunction with his brother over Acarnania, and is said to have founded the town of Alyzeia (modern Alyzia) there.

Notes

References 

 Stephanus of Byzantium, Stephani Byzantii Ethnicorum quae supersunt, edited by August Meineike (1790-1870), published 1849. A few entries from this important ancient handbook of place names have been translated by Brady Kiesling. Online version at the Topos Text Project.
 Strabo, The Geography of Strabo. Edition by H.L. Jones. Cambridge, Mass.: Harvard University Press; London: William Heinemann, Ltd. 1924. Online version at the Perseus Digital Library.
 Strabo, Geographica edited by A. Meineke. Leipzig: Teubner. 1877. Greek text available at the Perseus Digital Library.

Kings in Greek mythology

Ancient Acarnania
Laconian mythology